Deo Prakash Rai (December 1926 – 1981) was an Indian politician. A former Gorkha Brigade soldier, he was the general secretary of the All India Gorkha League and was made a minister in the West Bengal state government in 1967, 1969 and 1971.

Youth
Rai was born at Tukvar Tea Estate in Darjeeling in December 1926. He was the son of K.S. Sotang. He went to school at the Arung School of Education, obtaining a Higher English Certificate of Education.

Soldier
Rai served in the Gorkha Brigade for three years during the Second World War. He reached the rank of colour sergeant. In 1950, he was arrested in Malaya and deported, having been denounced as a "communist agent" by John Cross, chief instructor of the new Army School of Education (Gurkhas).

In politics and trade unionism
Rai was general secretary of the All India Gorkha League. In 1946, the Communist Party of India (CPI) proposed the notion of creating a "Gorkhasthan", merging Nepal, south Sikkim and the Darjeeling hills. The CPI tried to convince the Gorkha League to support the Gorkhasthan proposal, but Rai categorically opposed it. As a trade unionist, he was the founder of Darjeeling Chiya Kaman Shramik Sangha. He was patron of the Darjeeling Cultural Institute. As an author, he wrote many poems and short stories in the Nepali language.

Legislator
Rai represented the Darjeeling constituency in the West Bengal Legislative Assembly from 1957 until his death.

Minister
Rai was named Minister for Scheduled Castes and Tribes Welfare in the 1967 and 1969 United Front governments of West Bengal. He was again named as Minister in the 1971 state government, now in charge of Scheduled Castes Tribal Welfare and Tourism.

For a quarter of a century, Rai was the dominant politician in the Darjeeling hills. He received criticism from within his own community, which accused him of having entered into a secret pact with the state government in Calcutta. While Raj was a minister in three successive state cabinets, no progress on administrative autonomy for the Darjeeling hills was made.

1977 election
At the time of the 1977 elections, Rai was weakened by illness.

Rai died in 1981. After his death, his party was weakened and more militant factions such as Pranta Parishad and the Gorkha National Liberation Front came to dominate the political field in the hills.

References

1926 births
1981 deaths
Gurkhas
Akhil Bharatiya Gorkha League politicians
West Bengal MLAs 1957–1962
West Bengal MLAs 1962–1967
West Bengal MLAs 1967–1969
West Bengal MLAs 1969–1971
West Bengal MLAs 1971–1972
West Bengal MLAs 1972–1977
West Bengal MLAs 1977–1982
State cabinet ministers of West Bengal
Trade unionists from West Bengal
People from Darjeeling
Indian Gorkhas
British Indian Army soldiers
Rai people